Payal is a small town in Achham District in the Seti Zone of western Nepal. At the time of the 1991 Nepal census, the town had a population of 4404 living in 1015 houses. Jhadbazar is the centre market area of Payal. The town is in Chaurpati Rural Municipality Ward no. 04. At the time of the 2001 Nepal census, the population was 4950, of which 37% was literate.

References

Populated places in Achham District
Village development committees in Achham District